Sarandí Grande is a city in the north of the Florida Department of central Uruguay.

Geography

History
First on 6 July 1853 and again on 22 July 1861 the creation of a village here was approved by the Acts of Ley N° 331 and Ley N° 695 respectively. The village was founded in October 1874 in the area of the railway station. On 13 June 1906, its status was established as "Pueblo" (village) by the Act of Ley N° 3.042, at the time serving as head of the judicial section of "Estación Sarandí". It was renamed "Sarandí" and its status was elevated to "Villa" (town) on 15 October 1923 by the Act of Ley N° 7.638. Finally, on 1 July 1956 it was renamed "Sarandí Grande" and its status was elevated to "Ciudad" (city) by the Act of Ley N° 11.960.

Population
In 2011, Sarandi Grande had a population of 6,130. It is the second largest city of the department.
 
Source: Instituto Nacional de Estadística de Uruguay

Places of worship
 Our Lady of the Pillar Parish Church (Roman Catholic)

Economy
The economy relies on dairy farming and agriculture.

See also
Guarani language

References

External links
INE map of Sarandí Grande

Populated places in the Florida Department